Cameron Pimentel (born 13 April 1991) is a Bermudian competitive sailor. He competed at the 2016 Summer Olympics in Rio de Janeiro, in the men's Laser class.

References

1991 births
Living people
Bermudian male sailors (sport)
Olympic sailors of Bermuda
Sailors at the 2016 Summer Olympics – Laser
Sailors at the 2015 Pan American Games
Pan American Games competitors for Bermuda